Polyosteorhynchus is an extinct genus of coelacanth lobe-finned fish which lived during the Carboniferous period (Serpukhovian stage, about 318 - 326 million years ago). The size of Polyosteorhynchus was about 3,5 – 19 cm long.

Species of Polyosteorhynchus

Polyosteorhynchus simplex Lund and Lund, 1984

External links 
Polyosteorhynchus at Palaeos

Hadronectoridae
Prehistoric lobe-finned fish genera
Carboniferous bony fish
Mississippian fish of North America